18 Poems is a book of poetry written by the Welsh poet Dylan Thomas, published in 1934 as the winner of a contest sponsored by Sunday Referee. His first book, 18 Poems, introduced Thomas's new and distinctive style of poetry. This was characterised by tightly metered, rhyming verse and an impassioned tone. Written in his "womb- tomb period", the poems explore dark themes of love, death and birth, employing a rich combination of sexual connotations and religious symbolism. The lyricism and intensity of the poems in the book contrasted with the emotional restraint shown in the poetry of the successful modernist poets that worked as his contemporaries. The book received critical acclaim, but was not initially commercially successful.

The poem, The force that through the green fuse drives the flower, is known as the poem that "made Thomas famous", and also appears in the book. The poems are considered by many to be evocative but difficult to understand. Critic and contemporary of Thomas, Geoffrey Grigson, said that, regarding the influence of prominent poets on Thomas, the young poet was “untainted with Eliot or with Auden . . . whose poems, though a bit unintelligible, sounded at least familiar in an old grandiloquent way.”

The poems in 18 poems are untitled and are often referred to by their first lines.

Contents 
I see the boys of summer

Where  once the twilight locks

A process in the weather of the heart

Before I knocked

The force that through the green fuse

My hero bares his nerves

Where once the waters of your face

If I were tickled by the rub of love

Our eunuch dreams

Especially when the October wind

When, like a running grave

From love's first fever

In the beginning

Light breaks where no sun shines

I fellowed sleep

I dreamed my genesis

My world is pyramid

All all and all

Influences 
William Blake

References 

1934 poetry books
British poetry collections
Poetry by Dylan Thomas